Vomolailai (also Vomo Lailai) is a tiny uninhabited islet within the Mamanuca Islands of Fiji in the South Pacific. The islands are a part of the Fiji's Western Division.

Geography
Vomolailai (little Vomo) lies close to Vomo island.

References

External links
Vomo & Vomo Lailai

Islands of Fiji
Mamanuca Islands